"Untitled 03 | 05.28.2013.", (stylized "untitled 03 | 05.28.2013."), titled "Untitled 1" before its official release, is a song by American rapper Kendrick Lamar, featured on his compilation album, Untitled Unmastered.

Live performances 
The song was performed publicly for the first time on December 16, 2014, on The Colbert Report, during promotion for Lamar's third studio album, To Pimp a Butterfly.

Charts

References 

2013 songs
Kendrick Lamar songs
Songs written by Kendrick Lamar
Songs written by Bilal (American singer)
Songs written by Thundercat (musician)
Songs written by Terrace Martin